St. Ann's Academy is a Catholic school, under the administration of CISKD (Catholic Independent Schools of Kamloops Diocese) school board.

The school is co-educational, offering academic, fine arts, and business programs, as well as athletic, performing arts, and other extracurricular programs, for students from grades K to 12.

History

St. Ann's Academy was founded in 1880 by the Sisters of St. Ann. The present site was selected and purchased by the Sisters in 1910.  

St. Ann's Academy remained  a high school until 1970, unable to keep up with the changing demands of B.C.'s curriculum, it reverted to an elementary school. The Sisters continued to administer the school until 1978. Although the Sisters of St. Ann's, from the city of Victoria's St. Ann's Academy founded the school, they no longer teach there.

In 1980, Bishop Adam Exner asked the Congregation of Christian Brothers to open the high school section and in September 1981, St. Ann's Academy became a high school again.

Feeder Schools 
Our Lady of Perpetual Help – Kamloops
St. Ann’s Academy (Pre-school to Grade 12) – Kamloops
Saint Ann's Elementary School – Quesnel
Saint James Elementary & Middle school – Vernon
Sacred Heart Catholic School – Williams Lake

Independent school status

St. Ann's Academy is classified as a Group 1 school under British Columbia's Independent School Act. It receives 50% funding  from the Ministry of Education. The school receives no funding for capital costs. It is under charge of the Roman Catholic Diocese of Kamloops.

Academic performance

In 2012-2013, St. Ann's Academy Elementary is ranked 1st of 982 elementary schools, in the province of British Columbia, by the Fraser Institute.  St. Ann's Academy Secondary is ranked 43rd of 289 high schools, in the province of British Columbia, by the Fraser Institute.

Athletic performance 
St. Ann's is an associated member of BC school sports. It competes, under the name 'Crusaders', in the following sports:
 Volleyball
 Basketball
 Soccer
 Rugby
 Golf
 Wrestling
 Badminton
 Track & Field
 Speed Swimming
 Flag Football

Artistic programs

See also 
 St. Ann's Academy (Victoria, British Columbia) – founding school and convent of the Sisters of St. Ann's.

References

External links 
St. Ann's Academy (Kamloops)
Sisters of St. Ann - BC History 2011 archive
The Sisters Expand their Work - Royal BC Museum exhibit

Catholic secondary schools in British Columbia
High schools in Kamloops
Educational institutions established in 1880
1880 establishments in British Columbia